I Dream of NeNe: The Wedding is an American reality documentary television series that premiered on September 17, 2013 on Bravo. Developed as the third spin-off of The Real Housewives of Atlanta, featuring NeNe Leakes.

Premise
I Dream of NeNe: The Wedding features the nuptials of former spouses NeNe and Gregg Leakes. This show also serves as a bridge in between the fifth and sixth seasons of The Real housewives of Atlanta. The couple's marriage, divorce and reconnection have also been documented on The Real Housewives of Atlanta. It also chronicles NeNe in the weeks prior to the wedding as completes the preparations for the big day. With NeNe wanting to start her second marriage to Greg without any old issues, she improves her relationship with Gregg's children and also reunites with her father figure, Curtis. The couple married in a private ceremony among family and friends at the InterContinental Buckhead Hotel in Atlanta, Georgia on June 22, 2013. Her nine bridesmaids included Real Housewives of Atlanta co-star Cynthia Bailey and Real Housewives' recurring cast member Marlo Hampton.

Episodes

International broadcast
In Australia, the series premiered on Arena on October 24, 2013.

References

External links 
 
 

2010s American reality television series
2013 American television series debuts
2013 American television series endings
English-language television shows
Bravo (American TV network) original programming
Wedding television shows
The Real Housewives spin-offs
Television shows set in Atlanta
American television spin-offs
Reality television spin-offs